Wu Fang-hsien (born 15 July 1999) is a Taiwanese tennis player.

She has a career-high WTA doubles ranking of 90, achieved on 27 February 2023.

Career
Wu made her WTA Tour main-draw debut at the 2018 Washington Open in the doubles draw, partnering with Chen Pei-hsuan.

She reached the top 100 following her maiden WTA Tour title at the 2023 Thailand Open, partnering with Chan Hao-ching, moving close to 50 positions up to world No. 99 on 6 February 2023.

WTA career finals

Doubles: 2 (1 title, 1 runner-up)

WTA Challenger finals

Doubles: 1 (title)

ITF Circuit finals

Doubles: 36 (20 titles, 16 runner–ups)

References

External links
 
 

1999 births
Living people
Taiwanese female tennis players
21st-century Taiwanese women